Anja Salomonowitz (born in Vienna) is an Austrian film director and screenwriter, specialised on documentary films with political or social background.

Biography
Anja Salomonowitz was born in Vienna. She studied Film in Vienna and Berlin at the Hochschule für Film und Fernsehen (college for film and TV) in Potsdam-Babelsberg, Germany. During her studies, she worked for the Austrian film director Ulrich Seidl. 

Anja Salomonowitz developed her own poetic film language for her films. Real human experiences are condensed through artistic alienation. Her films received international recognition and numerous film awards. They found their way into relevant film literature. They are shown at hundreds of film festivals worldwide.

In 2014/15 she was the chairwoman of dok.at, the Austrian Documentary Film Interest Group, and in 2016/17 she was the chairwoman of the Austrian Film Directors Association. In 2014-2017 she was on the supervisory board of the Austrian Film Institute.

Her hybrid films follow a strict color concept. She is known for the fact that her films are explicitly political and that their artistic form extends the limits and possibilities of the cinematic.

Her first movie which started in the cinemas was the 52 minutes documentary film YOU WILL NEVER UNDERSTAND THIS (2003). There she confronted herself and her family with their family's history. Her Jewish grandaunt was in a concentration camp, her nanny joined the socialistic resistance and her grandmother "did nothing".

In her one-minute-long, shortest short film CODENAME FIGARO – as a contribution to the "Mozart year 2006" – she raises the ironic and politics critic question if „Le nozze di Figaro“ actually was a fictitious marriage.

IT HAPPENED JUST BEFORE is a film about human trafficking. This film has an artistic clou: the woman, whose stories are told, do not appear themselves in the movie but the stories are told by other people. These people have connections to the stories because of their daily work. IT HAPPENED JUST BEFORE is therefore also talking about usual documentary strategies.

SPAIN is Anja Salomonowitz´first feature realized in 2012 and started at the international forum at the Berlinale.

Her latest film, THIS MOVIE IS A GIFT with the artist Daniel Spoerri and her son Oskar had its cinema release in December 2019 and is currently running at film festivals and in museums and exhibitions worldwide, including mumok, Museum moderner Kunst Stiftung Ludwig Vienna, Art Berlin, Paris internationale.

Anja Salomonowitz has three sons with film director Virgil Widrich, one of whom, Oskar Salomonowitz (born 20.7.2008) died in an accident on 27.10.2020.

Filmography
documentary films:
 2003: You will never understand this (Das wirst du nie verstehen), 52 min.
 2006: It happened just before (Kurz davor ist es passiert), 72 min.
2013: The 727 Days without Karamo (Die 727 Tage ohne Karamo), 80 min.
2016: The boy will be circumcised (Der Junge wird beschnitten), 75 min.
2019: This movie is a gift (Dieser Film ist ein Geschenk), 72 min.

feature films:
 2012: Spanien (Spain), 102 min.

Short films:
 2000: Carmen, 23 min., Video
 2001: get to attack, 5 min
 2002: Projektionen eines Filmvorführers in einem Pornokino, 14 min., Video
 2005: Monument, Videoinstallation
 2006: Codename Figaro – Mozart 2006, 1 min., Video

Awards
 2010 "Outstanding Artist Award" of the Federal Ministry of Art in Austria
2019 Honorary Award of the Women's Film Days for the film series WIDERSTANDSKINO together with the director Mirjam Unger
The 727 days without Karamo:
 2013: Silver Eye Award, Jihlava Int. Documentary film festival
 It happened just before: 
 2006: Wiener Filmpreis (Vienna Film Award)
 2007: Caligari-Filmpreis, Internationales Forum des Jungen Films – Berlinale 2007
 2007: Innovative Artistic Award, Mar del Plata
 2007: New Vision Best Director Award, Alba International Film Festival
 2007: Friedensfilmpreis der Stadt Osnabrück 
2007: Award for Image Design, Diagonale Graz 
2007: Special Mention, Cinéma du Réel, Paris 
 You will never understand this:
 2003: Audience Award, Vienna students film festival
 2004: Prix Regards Neufs, Visions du Réel, Nyon

References

External links
 Official Homepage
 

Living people
Film people from Vienna
Austrian film directors
Austrian women film directors
Year of birth missing (living people)
Film directors from Vienna